Jaiyah Tauasuesimeamativa Saelua (born July 19, 1988) is an American Samoan footballer who plays as a center back for the American Samoa national team.

Saelua is a fa'afafine, a third gender present in Polynesian society. She is the first openly non-binary and trans woman to compete in a FIFA World Cup qualifier.

Saelua is featured in the 2014 documentary Next Goal Wins. A feature film version of Next Goal Wins is planned, which will feature Kaimana, an actor who is also a fa'afafine, as Saelua, and will be directed by Taika Waititi.

Early life
Saelua took up football at school as an 11-year-old. Her first coach was Nicky Salapu, the man famous for being the goalkeeper during American Samoa's world-record 31-0 defeat to Australia in 2001. Saelua is a former performing arts student who studied at the University of Hawaii.

Club career
Saelua has played for former FFAS Senior League men's champions FC SKBC. She now plays for and captain her village club Ilaoa and To'omata. Following the 2023 OFC Champions League qualifying stage she announced that she was considering retirement.

International career

Early career (2004–2011) 
Saelua made her debut for the American Samoa national team as a 15-year-old during qualifying for the 2006 World Cup, appearing as a first-half substitute in an 11–0 defeat to Fiji. She then made a further three substitute appearances in qualifying for the 2010 World Cup, as well as 4 substitute appearances at the 2011 Pacific Games.

2014 World Cup qualification campaign (2011) 
With the arrival of coach Thomas Rongen in 2011, Saelua was given extended game time, and she made her first start for the team and achieved her first-ever international win against Tonga during qualifying for the 2014 World Cup. Until this point, American Samoa had been outscored 229–12 in all the international matches it had played, and were joint-last in the FIFA World Rankings. Saelua provided an assist and made a last-minute goalline clearance to help her team to the narrow 2–1 win, and she was declared woman of the match by her coach. She was later sent a letter by FIFA president Sepp Blatter, recognising her achievements as the first openly transgender footballer to appear in a World Cup qualifying match.

The team followed up the win against Tonga with a 1–1 draw with the Cook Islands. Needing only a win in team's last game against bitter rivals Samoa to progress to the next stage of qualification, the team fell agonisingly short, hitting the post in the dying minutes before a last-gasp Samoa goal eliminated the rival from the tournament.

American Samoa's efforts to qualify for the 2014 World Cup are chronicled in the 2014 British Documentary Film Next Goal Wins, in which Saelua plays an integral part. The film also documents the team's 2011 Pacific Games campaign.

Transition and 2019 Pacific Games (2015–2019) 
Although intending to continue playing for the national team, Saelua was left out of the squad for qualifying for the 2018 World Cup. This was in part because she was undergoing her medical transition at the time. Saelua considered the possibility of playing for the American Samoa women's team after she had medically transitioned.

Saelua was recalled to the men's national squad for the 2019 Pacific Games, joining veteran goalkeeper Nicky Salapu. The team was managed by returning coach Tunoa Lui, who had previously presided over American Samoa's world-record 31–0 loss to Australia in 2001. In the team's first match, they were praised for performing better than expected in a 5–0 loss to one of the pre-tournament favourites New Caledonia, and Saelua was praised for her defensive performance. Saelua was also commended for her role in earning the team a 1–1 draw with Tuvalu. She received a yellow card during the match. This was the first game American Samoa had not lost at the tournament in 36 years.

Managerial career
Saelua coached the American Samoan boys football team, Leone Lions, during the 2018–2019 Boys ASHSAA season. She led the team to the 2018–2019 ASHSAA Boys J-V title, for which she received the "Coach of the Year Award" from the FFAS.

Style of play
Saelua plays in full make-up whenever she takes to the football field. She is known for her crunching tackles and is described as a defender who "takes no prisoners".

Other football-related activities
Since becoming the first non-binary player to play in a FIFA-sanctioned tournament, Saelua has become a FIFA ambassador for equality and LGBT athletes. She was also appointed to the jury of the FIFA Diversity Award.

Saelua has also trained as a referee, and has helped referee matches in her American Samoan homeland.

Personal life
Saelua is a fa'afafine, a third gender present in Polynesian society. Saelua began her gender transition before the 2018 World Cup Qualifiers in 2015. She has continued to play football after her transition, including at the 2019 Pacific Games.

In popular culture
Saelua is featured in two films: firstly in the highly-rated 2014 British documentary film Next Goal Wins, which documents the American Samoan football team's attempts to qualify for the 2014 FIFA World Cup and first international win, and secondly in the upcoming Hollywood comedy-drama re-make of Next Goal Wins directed by Taika Waititi. The re-make is expected to be released in late 2020.

Waititi considered casting Saelua in his adaptation of the 2014 documentary Next Goal Wins, which she had previously starred in, but he ultimately choose fellow Samoan fa'afafine Kaimana to play the role.

Saelua is mentioned in the book Thirty-One Nil: On the Road With Football's Outsiders. She is also mentioned in the children's book Football School Star Players: 50 Inspiring Stories of True Football Heroes.

Career statistics

References

1988 births
Living people
People from Western District, American Samoa
American people of Samoan descent
Association football central defenders
Fa'afafine
LGBT association football players
American Samoan LGBT sportspeople
University of Hawaiʻi alumni
Ilaoa and To'omata players
FFAS Senior League players
American Samoa international footballers